Playing with Fire is a 1916 American silent drama film directed by Francis J. Grandon, starring Olga Petrova, and released by Metro Pictures. It is now considered to be a lost film.

Cast 
 Olga Petrova as Jean Serian (as Mme. Petrova)
 Arthur Hoops as Geoffrey Vane
 Evelyn Brent as Lucille Vane
 Pierre LeMay as Philip Derblay
 Catherine Doucet as Rosa Derblay (credited as Catherine Calhoun)
 Philip Hahn as Jacques Gobert

References

External links

  Playing with Fire (kinotv)

1916 films
1916 drama films
1916 lost films
Silent American drama films
American silent feature films
American black-and-white films
Films directed by Francis J. Grandon
Lost American films
Lost drama films
1910s American films